Emad Al-Shammeri (Arabic:عماد الشمري; born 22 January 1980) is a Qatari footballer. He currently plays for as a goalkeeper.

References

External links 
 

Qatari footballers
1980 births
Living people
Al-Shamal SC players
Al Sadd SC players
Umm Salal SC players
Mesaimeer SC players
Qatar Stars League players
Qatari Second Division players
Association football goalkeepers